In esoteric cosmology, a plane is conceived as a subtle state, level, or region of reality, each plane corresponding to some type, kind, or category of being.

The concept may be found in religious and esoteric teachings—e.g. Vedanta (Advaita Vedanta), Ayyavazhi, shamanism, Hermeticism, Neoplatonism, Gnosticism, Kashmir Shaivism, Sant Mat/Surat Shabd Yoga, Sufism, Druze, Kabbalah, Theosophy, Anthroposophy, Rosicrucianism (Esoteric Christian), Eckankar, Ascended Master Teachings, etc.—which propound the idea of a whole series of subtle planes or worlds or dimensions which, from a center, interpenetrate themselves and the physical planet in which we live, the solar systems, and all the physical structures of the universe. This interpenetration of planes culminates in the universe itself as a physical structured, dynamic and evolutive expression emanated through a series of steadily denser stages, becoming progressively more material and embodied.

The emanation is conceived, according to esoteric teachings, to have originated, at the dawn of the universe's manifestation, in The Supreme Being who sent out—from the unmanifested Absolute beyond comprehension—the dynamic force of creative energy, as sound-vibration ("the Word"), into the abyss of space. Alternatively, it states that this dynamic force is being sent forth, through the ages, framing all things that constitute and inhabit the universe.

Origins of the concept
The concept of planes of existence might be seen as deriving from shamanic and traditional mythological ideas of a vertical world-axis—for example a cosmic mountain, tree, or pole (such as Yggdrasil or Mount Meru)—or a philosophical conception of a Great Chain of Being, arranged metaphorically from God down to inanimate matter.

However the original source of the word plane in this context is the late Neoplatonist Proclus, who refers to to platos, "breadth", which was the equivalent of the 19th-century theosophical use. An example is the phrase en to psychiko platei.

Conceptions in ancient traditions
Directly equivalent concepts in Indian thought are lokas and bhuvanas. In Hindu cosmology, there are many lokas or worlds, that are identified with both traditional cosmology and states of meditation.

Planes of existence may have been referred to by the use of the term corresponding to the word "egg" in English. For example, the Sanskrit term Brahmanda translates to "The entire creation" as opposed to the lazy inference "The Egg of Creation". Certain Puranic accounts posit that the Brahmanda is the superset of a set of fractal smaller Eggs, as is seen in the assertion of the equivalence of the Brahmanda and the Pinda.

The ancient Norse mythology gave the name "Ginnungagap" to the primordial "Chaos", which was bounded upon the northern side by the cold and foggy "Niflheim"—the land of mist and fog—and upon the south side by the fire "Muspelheim". When heat and cold entered into space which was occupied by Chaos or Ginnungagap, they caused the crystallization of the visible universe.

In the medieval West and Middle East, one finds reference to four worlds (olam) in Kabbalah, or five in Sufism (where they are also called tanazzulat; "descents"), and also in Lurianic Kabbalah. In Kabbalah, each of the four or five worlds are themselves divided into ten sefirot, or else divided in other ways.

Esoteric conceptions

The alchemists of the Middle Ages proposed ideas about the constitution of the universe through a hermetic language full of esoteric words, phrases, and signs designed to cloak their meaning from those not initiated into the ways of alchemy. In his "Physica" (1633), the Rosicrucian alchemist Jan Baptist van Helmont, wrote: "Ad huc spiritum incognitum Gas voco" q.e., "This hitherto unknown Spirit I call Gas." Further on in the same work he says, "This vapor which I have called Gas is not far removed from the Chaos the ancients spoke of." Later on, similar ideas would evolve around the idea of 'aether'.

In the late 19th century, the metaphysical term "planes" was popularised by the theosophy of H. P. Blavatsky, who in The Secret Doctrine and other writings propounded a complex cosmology consisting of seven planes and subplanes, based on a synthesis of Eastern and Western ideas. From theosophy the term made its way to later esoteric systems such as that of Alice Bailey, who was very influential in shaping the worldview of the New Age movement. The term is also found in some Eastern teachings that have some Western influence, such as the cosmology of Sri Aurobindo and some of the later Sant Mat, and also in some descriptions of Buddhist cosmology. The teachings of Surat Shabd Yoga also include several planes of the creation within both the macrocosm and microcosm, including the Bramanda egg contained within the Sach Khand egg. Max Theon used the word "States" (French Etat) rather than "Planes", in his cosmic philosophy, but the meaning is the same.

The planes in Theosophy were further systematized in the writings of C.W. Leadbeater and Annie Besant.

In the early 20th century, Max Heindel presented in The Rosicrucian Cosmo-Conception a cosmology related to the scheme of evolution in general and the evolution of the Solar System and the Earth in particular, according to the Rosicrucians. He establishes, through the conceptions presented, a bridge between modern science (currently starting research into the subtler etheric plane of existence behind the physical) and religion, in order that this last one may be able to address man's inner questions raised by scientific advancement.

Emanation vs. Big Bang

Most cosmologists today believe that the universe expanded from a singularity approximately 13.8 billion years ago in a 'smeared-out singularity' called the Big Bang, meaning that space itself came into being at the moment of the big bang and has expanded ever since, creating and carrying the galaxies with it.
	 
However, in esoteric cosmology expansion refers to the emanation or unfolding of steadily denser planes or spheres from the spiritual summit, what Greek philosophy called The One, until the lowest and most material world is reached.
	 
According to Rosicrucians, another difference is that there is no such thing as empty or void space. 
"The space is Spirit in its attenuated form; while matter is crystallized space or Spirit. Spirit in manifestation is dual, that which we see as Form is the negative manifestation of Spirit--crystallized and inert. The positive pole of Spirit manifests as Life, galvanizing the negative Form into action, but both Life and Form originated in Spirit, Space, Chaos! On the other hand, Chaos is not a state which has existed in the past and has now entirely disappeared. It is all around us at the present moment. Were it not that old forms--having outlived their usefulness--are constantly being resolved back into that Chaos, which is also as constantly giving birth to new forms, there could be no progress; the work of evolution would cease and stagnation would prevent the possibility of advancement."

The planes
Many occult, psychic, metaphysical, mystical, and esoteric teachings assert that at least four separate planes of existence exist; however, these differing occult and metaphysical schools often label the planes of existence with differing terminologies. These planes of existence often tend to overlap with each other heavily in both description and conception (especially between schools), and can roughly be delineated into "physical", "mental", "spiritual", or "transcendent" categories.

Do note that the listing of planes below is based mostly on Theosophy. Other religions might structure their planes significantly differently.

Physical plane
The physical plane, physical world, or physical universe, in emanationist metaphysics taught in Neoplatonism, Hermeticism, Hinduism and Theosophy, refers to the visible reality of space and time, energy and matter: the physical universe in Occultism and esoteric cosmology is the lowest or densest of a series of planes of existence.

According to Theosophists, after the material plane is the etheric plane and both of these planes are connected to make up the first (physical) plane. Theosophy also teaches that when the physical body dies the etheric body is left behind and the soul forms into an astral body on the astral plane.

The psychical researcher F. W. H. Myers proposed the existence of a “metetherial world”, which he wrote to be a world of images lying beyond the physical world. He wrote that apparitions have a real existence in the metetherial world which he described as a dream-like world.

Astral plane

The astral plane, also called the astral world, is where consciousness goes after physical death. According to occult philosophy, all people possess an astral body. The astral plane (also known as the astral world) was postulated by classical (particularly neoplatonic), medieval, oriental, and esoteric philosophies and mystery religions. It is the world of the planetary spheres, crossed by the soul in its astral body on the way to being born and after death, and generally said to be populated by angels, spirits, or other non-physical beings.  In the late 19th and early 20th century the term was popularised by Theosophy and neo-Rosicrucianism.

Throughout the Renaissance, philosophers, Paracelsians, Rosicrucians and alchemists continued to discuss the nature of the astral world intermediate between Earth and the divine. The Barzakh, olam mithal or intermediate world in Islam and the "World of Yetzirah" in Lurianic Kabbalah are related concepts.

According to occult teachings the astral plane can be visited consciously through astral projection, meditation, and mantra, near-death experience, lucid dreaming, or other means.  Individuals that are trained in the use of the astral vehicle can separate their consciousness in the astral vehicle from the physical body at will.

The Theosophist author Curuppumullage Jinarajadasa wrote: "When a person dies, they become fully conscious in the astral body. After a certain time, the astral body disintegrates, and the person then becomes conscious on the mental plane."

Occultist George Arundale wrote:

In the astral world exist temporarily all those physical entities, men and animals, for whom sleep involves a separation of the physical body for a time from the higher bodies. While we "sleep", we live in our astral bodies, either fully conscious and active, or partly conscious and semi-dormant, as the case may be, according to our evolutionary growth; when we "wake", the physical and the higher bodies are interlocked again, and we cease to be inhabitants of the astral world.” 

Some writers have asserted the astral plane can be reached by dreaming. Sylvan Muldoon and psychical researcher Hereward Carrington in their book The Projection of the Astral Body (1929) wrote:"When you are dreaming you are not really in the same world as when you are conscious – in the physical – although the two worlds merge into one another. While dreaming, you really are in the astral plane, and usually your astral body is in the zone of quietude."Astral projection author Robert Bruce describes the astral as seven planes that take the form of planar surfaces when approached from a distance, separated by immense coloured "buffer zones".  These planes are endlessly repeating ruled Cartesian coordinate system grids, tiled with a single signature pattern that is different for each plane. Higher planes have bright, colourful patterns, whereas lower planes appear far duller. Every detail of these patterns acts as a consistent portal to a different kingdom inside the plane, which itself comprises many separate realms. Bruce notes that the astral may also be entered by means of long tubes that bear visual similarity to these planes, and conjectures that the grids and tubes are in fact the same structures approached from a different perceptual angle.

In his book Autobiography of a Yogi, Paramhansa Yogananda provides details about the astral planes learned from his resurrected guru Swami Sri Yukteswar Giri. Yogananda reveals that nearly all individuals enter the astral planes after death. There they work out the seeds of past karma through astral incarnations, or (if their karma requires) they return to earthly incarnations for further refinement. Once an individual has attained the meditative state of nirvikalpa samadhi in an earthy or astral incarnation, the soul may progress upward to the "illumined astral planet" of Hiranyaloka. After this transitional stage, the soul may then move upward to the more subtle causal spheres where many incarnations allow them to further refine until final unification.

Mental and Causal plane

Charles Webster Leadbeater wrote:

In the mental world one formulates a thought and it is instantly transmitted to the mind of another without any expression in the form of words. Therefore on that plane language does not matter in the least; but helpers working in the astral world, who have not yet the power to use the mental vehicle.

Annie Besant wrote that "The mental plane, as its name implies, is that which belongs to consciousness working as thought; not of the mind as it works through the brain, but as it works through its own world, unencumbered with physical spirit-matter."

A detailed description of the mental plane, along with the mental body, is provided by Arthur E. Powell, who has compiled information in the works of Besant and Leadbeater in a series of books on each of the subtle bodies.

According to Hindu occultism the mental plane consists of two divisions, the lower division is known as heaven (swarglok) and the upper division is known as the causal plane (maharlok).

Satguru Sivaya Subramuniyaswami wrote:

The causal plane is the world of light and blessedness, the highest of heavenly regions, extolled in the scriptures of all faiths. It is the foundation of existence, the source of visions, the point of conception, the apex of creation. The causal plane is the abode of Lord Siva and his entourage of Mahadevas and other highly evolved souls who exist in their own self-effulgent form—radiant bodies of centillions of quantum light particles.

Sri Aurobindo developed a very different concept of the mental plane, through his own synthesis of Vedanta (including the Taittiriya Upanishad), Tantra, Theosophy, and Max Théon ideas (which he received via The Mother, who was Theon's student in occultism for two years).  In this cosmology, there are seven cosmic planes, three lower, corresponding to relative existence (the Physical, Vital, and Mental), and four higher, representing infinite divine reality (Life Divine bk. 1 ch. 27)  The Aurobindonian Mind or Mental Plane constitutes a large zone of being from the mental vital to the overmental divine region (Letters on Yoga, Jyoti and Prem Sobel 1984), but as with the later Theosophical concept it constitutes an objective reality of sheer mind or thought.

Buddhic/Intuitional/Soul plane
The buddhic plane is described as a realm of pure consciousness. According to Theosophy the buddhic plane exists to develop buddhic consciousness which means to become unselfish and solve any problems with the ego. Charles Leadbeater wrote that in the buddhic plane man casts off the delusion of the self and enters a realization of unity.

Annie Besant defined the buddhic plane as Persistent, conscious, spiritual awareness. This is the full consciousness of the buddhic or intuitional level. This is the perceptive consciousness which is the outstanding characteristic of the Hierarchy. The life focus of the man shifts to the buddhic plane. This is the fourth or middle state of consciousness.

Sri Aurobindo calls the level above the mental plane the supermind.

Spiritual planes
George Winslow Plummer wrote that the spiritual plane is split into many sub-planes (such as the "Atmic plane") and that on these planes live spiritual being who are more advanced in development and status than ordinary man. According to metaphysical teachings the goal of the spiritual plane is to gain spiritual knowledge and experience.

In  Theosophy, the Anupapaduka or Monadic Plane is the plane in which the monad  (also called the Holy Spirit or Oversoul) is said to exist.  According to Alan Schneider, the Monadic Plane is the sixth plane of ascension, and is analogous to the sixth chakra, ajna, and the hidden sephirah of the Kabbalistic Tree of Life:  daath. (Da'ath/da'at represents the 'reflection of' (the 'inner dimension' of) the infinity of kether). It would appear, though it is not certain by any means, that it is possible for a human to attain this spiritual realm after ascending through lower, possibly inferior, planes of existence (the higher consciousness has also to descend into mind, into life, into matter), the physical plane being the lowest of all. It is rare occurrence indeed to meet someone on the monadic plane, and thus of great spiritual significance.

The highest of the spiritual planes is the Adi or Divine Plane/Logoic Plane, which contains the Divine Word and/or Divine Presence/I AM Presence. According to some occult teachings, all souls are born on the divine plane and then descend down through the lower planes; however souls will work their way back to the divine plane. On the divine plane souls can be opened to conscious communication with the sphere of the divine known as the Absolute and receive knowledge about the nature of reality.
Joshua David Stone describes the plane as complete unity with God.

Rosicrucianism teaches that the divine plane is where Jesus dwelt in Christ consciousness.

31 planes

In Buddhism, the world is made up of 31 planes of existence that one can be reborn into, separated into 3 realms.

The Summerland

The Summerland is the name given by Theosophists, Spiritualists, Wiccans, and some earth-based contemporary pagan religions to their conceptualization of existence on a plane in an afterlife.

Emanuel Swedenborg (1688–1772) inspired Andrew Jackson Davis (1826–1910), in his major work The Great Harmonia to say that Summerland is the pinnacle of spiritual achievement in the afterlife; that is, it is the highest level, or sphere, of the afterlife we can hope to enter. The common portrayal of the Summerland is as a place of rest for souls after or between their earthly incarnations. Some believe spirits will stay in the Summerland for an eternal afterlife, though others believe after an amount of time some spirits will reincarnate. The Summerland is also envisioned as a place for recollection and reunion with deceased loved ones.

As the name suggests, it is often imagined as a place of beauty and peace, where everything people hold close to their hearts is preserved in its fullest beauty for eternity. It is envisioned as containing wide (possibly eternal) fields  of rolling green hills and lush grass. In many ways, this ideology is similar to the Welsh view of Annwn as an afterlife realm. The Summerland is also viewed as the place where one goes in the afterlife in traditions of Spiritualism and Theosophy, which is where Wicca got the term.

In Theosophy, the term "Summerland" is used without the definite article "the". Summerland, also called the Astral plane Heaven, is depicted as where souls who have been good in their previous lives go between incarnations. Those who have been bad go to Hell, which is believed to be located below the surface of the Earth and is on the astral plane and is composed of the densest astral matter; the Spiritual Hierarchy functioning within Earth functions on the etheric plane below the surface of the Earth.

It is believed by Theosophists that most people (those at high levels of initiation) go to a specific Summerland that is set up for people of each religion. For example, Christians go to a Christian heaven, Jews go to a Jewish heaven, Muslims go to a Muslim heaven, Hindus goes to a Hindu heaven, Theosophists go to a Theosophical heaven, and so forth, each heaven being like that described in the scriptures of that religion. There is also a generic Summerland for those who were atheists or agnostics in their previous lives. People who belong to religions that don't believe in reincarnation are surprised to find out when they get to heaven that they will have to reincarnate again within a few dozen to a few hundred years. Each heaven is believed to be an extensive structure composed of astral matter located on the astral plane about three or four miles (5–6 km) above the surface of Earth, above that part of the world where the particular religion that the heaven is meant for is most predominant.

Theosophists also believe there is another higher level of heaven called Devachan, also called the Mental plane Heaven, which some but not all souls reach between incarnations—only those souls that are more highly developed spiritually reach this level, those souls that are at the first, second, and third levels of initiation. Devachan is several miles (around 10 km) higher above the surface of Earth than Summerland.

The final permanent eternal afterlife heaven to which Theosophists believe most people will go millions or billions of years in the future, after our cycle of reincarnations in this Round is over. In order to go to Nirvana, it is necessary to have attained the fourth level of initiation or higher, meaning one is an arhat and thus no longer needs to reincarnate.

Inhabitants of the various planes
Occult writers such as Geoffrey Hodson, Mellie Uyldert, and Dora van Gelder had attempted to classify different spiritual beings into a hierarchy based on their assumed place and function on the planes of existence.

Charles Webster Leadbeater fundamentally described and incorporated his comprehension of intangible beings for Theosophy. Along with him there are various planes intertwined with the quotidian human world and are all inhabited by multitudes of entities. Each plane is purported as composed of discrete density of astral or ethereal matter and frequently the denizens of a plane have no discernment of other ones. Other Theosophical writers such as Alice Bailey, a contemporary of Leadbeater, also gave continuousness to Theosophical concepts of ethereal beings and her works had a great impact over New Age movement. She puts the nature spirits and devas as ethereal beings immersed in macro divisions of an interwoven threefold universe, usually they belong to the etheric, astral, or mental planes. The ethereal entities of the four kingdoms, Earth, Air, Fire, and Water, are forces of nature.

The Dutch writer and clairvoyant Mellie Uyldert characterized the semblance and behavior of ethereal entities on the etheric plane, which, she said, hover above plants and transfer energy for vitalizing the plant, then nourishing themselves on rays of sunlight. She depicted them as asexual gender, and composed of etheric matter.
They fly three meters over the ground, some have wings like butterflies while others only have a small face and an aura waving graciously. Some are huge while others may have the size of one inch.

See also
Astral body
Astral projection
Aura
Chain of being
Many-worlds interpretation
Plane (Dungeons & Dragons)
Silver cord
Spiritual evolution
Spirituality
Subtle body
Transcendental realism (Evola)

References

Further reading
Blavatsky, H.P., The Secret Doctrine, Theosophical Publishing House, 1888.
Heindel, Max, The Rosicrucian Mysteries (Chapter III: The Visible and the Invisible Worlds), 1911, .
Poortman, Johannes Jacob, Vehicles of Consciousness. The Concept of Hylic Pluralism, The Theosophical Society in Netherlands, 1978.
Yogananda, Paramahansa, Autobiography of a Yogi, Los Angeles, CA: Self-Realization Fellowship, 1946, Chapter 43.

External links
Vedic cosmology - planetarium
The Thirty-one Planes of Existence, according to Buddhist cosmology
“The Grand Scheme of All Creation”, part of the Sant Ajaib Singh Ji Memorial Site (a small Radhasoami cosmological diagram)
The Creation According to Sant Mat
The Inner Planes of Creation - a Surat Shabd Yoga/Sant Mat diagram
The Material World a Reverse Reflection of the Spiritual Worlds according to Rosicrucian cosmology:
The Seven Worlds
The Supreme Being, The Cosmic Planes and God

Esoteric cosmology
Paranormal terminology
Theosophical philosophical concepts